Gaddi Axel Aguirre Ledezma (born 31 March 1996) is a Mexican professional footballer who plays as a centre-back for Liga MX club Atlas.

Career statistics

Club

Honours
Tampico Madero
Liga de Expansión MX: Guardianes 2020

Atlas
Liga MX: Apertura 2021, Clausura 2022
Campeón de Campeones: 2022

References

1996 births
Living people
Mexican footballers
Association football defenders
Atlas F.C. footballers
Tampico Madero F.C. footballers
Liga MX players
Ascenso MX players
Liga Premier de México players
Tercera División de México players
Footballers from Guadalajara, Jalisco